The 2015–16 season Deportivo de La Coruña season was the club's 109th in its history and its 44th in the top-tier of Spanish football.

Stadium information

Name – Riazor
City – A Coruña
Capacity – 34,600
Inauguration – 1944
Pitch size – 105 x 68 m

Players

Current squad

Out on loan

Competitions

La Liga

League table

Result round by round

Matches

See also
2015–16 La Liga

References

Deportivo de La Coruña seasons
Spanish football clubs 2015–16 season